The South Bendigo Football Netball Club, nicknamed the Bloods, is an Australian rules football and netball club based in the city of Bendigo, Victoria.

The club teams currently compete in the Bendigo Football Netball League.

History
South Bendigo was established in 1893 and joined the Bendigo Football League and remains the only club to have continued every season since without a period of recess.

Since South Bendigo entered the league in 1893, no club has won more premierships. They sit third on the all-time list of BFL premierships, behind Eaglehawk and Sandhurst.

Honours
Premierships & Grand Finals

Club song

VFL / AFL Players
The following footballers played with South Bendigo prior to making their VFL/AFL debut.
1910 - Joe Scaddan (Collingwood player & Subiaco coach)
1914 - Percy Daykin (Carlton)
1922 - Arthur Hando (South Melbourne player) 
1941 - Jack Knight (Collingwood player & St Kilda coach)
1984 - Peter Dean (Carlton premiership player 1987 & 1995)
1993 - Leigh Colbert (Geelong and North Melbourne player)

References

External links
 Official website

 
Sports clubs established in 1893
Australian rules football clubs established in 1893
Bendigo Football League clubs
1893 establishments in Australia
Netball teams in Victoria (Australia)